Piero Pozzi (18 October 1920 – 7 December 1991) was an Italian professional football player. 

Pozzi was born in Vercelli on 18 October 1920, and died on 7 December 1991, at the age of 71.

References

Sources
Profile at Enciclopediadelcalcio.it

1920 births
1991 deaths
People from Vercelli
Association football midfielders
Italian footballers
Serie A players
Aurora Pro Patria 1919 players
Inter Milan players
Torino F.C. players
Cagliari Calcio players
Calcio Lecco 1912 players
A.S.D. La Biellese players